Norman Nielsen is the name of:

Norman Nielson (1928–2002), South African footballer
Norman L. Nielsen, American politician

See also
Nielsen Norman Group, American software company